Miklós Kocsár (21 December 1933 – 29 August 2019) was a Hungarian composer.

He was born in Debrecen, Hungary, (son of László Kocsár and Erzsébet Borsy) and studied composition at the Academy of Music in Budapest with Ferenc Farkas, graduating in 1959. After completing his studies, he took a position in 1972 as Professor at the Béla Bartók Conservatory in Budapest, teaching theory and composition.

From 1974–95, he worked in Hungarian Radio. In 1973 he won the Erkel Prize.

Selected works
Duó-Szerenád (Duo Serenade) for violin and viola (1955)
String Quartet (1960)
Szonáta szólóhegedűre (Sonata) for violin solo (1961–1991)
Hét változat mélyhegedűre (7 Variations) for viola solo (1983)
Concerto lirico for viola and orchestra (2000)

Discography
Kocsár's works have been recorded an issued on media including:
Miklós Kocsár: Choral Works Label: Hungaroton
Miklós Kocsár: Concerto in memoriam Z.H. Label: Hungaroton
Miklós Kocsár: Repliche Nos. 1–3 / Music of the Seasons / Songs on Poems by Lajos Kassak Label: Hungaroton
Miklós Kocsár: Echos Nos. 1–4 / Hollos: Ciklus / Buyanovski: 4 Improvisations for horn solo Label: Hungaroton
Horusitzky / Sugar, R. / Kosa / Balassa / Kocsar: Hungarian Contemporary Songs Label: Hungaroton
Soproni / Farkas / Kocsar / Togobickij / Vajda: Violin Sonatas and Duets Label: Hungaroton
Choral Works from the End of the Millennium Label: Hungaroton
Hungarian Contemporary Works for Flute Duet Label: Hungaroton
Jereb: Monography / Szekely: Rhapsody / Farkas, F.: Bucinata / Kocsar: Rhapsody / Victor: Viatrone Label: Hungaroton
Hungarian Contemporary Choral Works Label: Hungaroton
Choral Music Label: Hungaroton
Hungarian Contemporary Choral Anthology Label: Hungaroton
Cimbalom Music Label: Hungaroton
Miklós Kocsár: Repliche No. 2 Label: Hungaroton 

Kocsár has composed for film soundtracks including:
Csodakarikás (TV movie), 1987
Csontváry, 1980
Napraforgó, 1974
Az óriás, 1960

References

1933 births
2019 deaths
20th-century composers
21st-century composers
Hungarian film score composers
Male film score composers
Hungarian music educators
Artists of Merit of the Hungarian People's Republic
20th-century Hungarian male musicians
21st-century Hungarian male musicians
People from Debrecen